Brigadier General (retired) Olayinka Sule (4 May 1948 – 23 August 2020) was the Administrator of Jigawa State, Nigeria from August 1991 to January 1992 during the military regime of General Ibrahim Babangida.

In 1983 Lt. Colonel Sule was military attache to the permanent mission of Nigeria to the United Nations.
Promoted to Colonel, Sule was the first Administrator of Jigawa State, Nigeria after it was formed from part of Kano State in August 1991.
He handed over to the elected civilian governor Ali Sa'ad Birnin-Kudu in January 1992 at the start of the Nigerian Third Republic.
In 1996 he was General Officer Commanding (GOC) the 1st Mechanised Division of the Nigerian Army.
He retired from the army that year.

After his retirement, he became captain of the Ikeja Golf Club.
He was an excellent golf player, winning several tournaments.

References

Governors of Jigawa State
Nigerian generals
1948 births
2020 deaths
Nigerian Muslims
Yoruba military personnel